The Protestant Episcopal Cathedral Foundation Police, commonly known as the Washington National Cathedral Police, is a small private police force responsible for protecting the land of the Protestant Episcopal Cathedral Foundation, which mainly consists of the Washington National Cathedral in Washington, DC, in the United States. The 57-acre grounds of the Cathedral include three schools (Beauvoir, St. Albans School, and the Cathedral school), a parish church, places of religious study, the bishop's house and administration, plus assorted other buildings, gardens and playing fields. The police force numbers around 20 officers, who are licensed as special police officers by the Metropolitan Police Department of the District of Columbia, and enjoy full police powers when on Cathedral Foundation property or in pursuit of suspects.

Functions
The main functions of the police, in addition to public safety, are lost property management and traffic control, and the force works closely with both the Metropolitan Police and federal agencies when planning major state events, such as the funeral of President Ronald Reagan. The police operate a number of marked vehicles, with decals and lightbars.

Powers and authority

Police officers employed by this department have full arrest authority while on duty, pursuant to the DC Code of Municipal Regulations (DCMR), Title 6a, Chapter 11, Section 1109.3 and DCMR Title 17, Chapter 21, Section 2113.4.

Training
National Cathedral police have attended the Washington DC Campus Law Enforcement Academy, this academy is sanctioned by DC City Council and is attended by George Washington University Police and University of District of Columbia Police as well as several other agencies.

Rank Structure
There are at least two ranks within the National Cathedral Police:

Officer
Corporal.

See also
 List of law enforcement agencies in the District of Columbia

References

External links
Washington National Cathedral website
Badge of the Cathedral Police

Church law enforcement agencies
Law enforcement agencies of the District of Columbia
Specialist police departments of the United States
Washington National Cathedral